Work Work may refer to:

"Work Work" (2005), a song by the Rakes from Capture/Release
"Work Work" (2008), a song by N-Dubz from Uncle B
"Work Work" (2013), the clean title of Britney Spears's song "Work Bitch"
"Work Work" (2014), a song by Clipping from CLPPNG